Wesley Michael Nott (born May 19, 1952) is a former American football quarterback who played one season with the Kansas City Chiefs of the National Football League. Nott played college football at Santa Clara University and attended Analy High School in Sebastopol, California. He was also a member of the Saskatchewan Roughriders and BC Lions of the Canadian Football League.

External links
Just Sports Stats
Fanbase profile

Living people
1952 births
Players of American football from California
American football quarterbacks
Canadian football quarterbacks
American players of Canadian football
Santa Clara Broncos football players
Kansas City Chiefs players
Saskatchewan Roughriders players
BC Lions players
Sportspeople from Eureka, California